The 1932 United States presidential election in Washington took place on November 8, 1932, as part of the 1932 United States presidential election. State voters chose eight representatives, or electors, to the Electoral College, who voted for president and vice president.

Background
Outside a few Presidential and gubernatorial elections, Washington was a virtually one-party Republican state during the “System of 1896”, where the only competition was via Republican primaries. Apart from Woodrow Wilson’s two elections, during the first of which the GOP was severely divided, no Democrat after William Jennings Bryan in 1900 carried a single county in the state until Al Smith won German Catholic Ferry County in 1928.

However, since the 1928 election when Washington state had been won by more than 36 percentage points, the United States had fallen into the Great Depression, which had been particularly severe in the rural western parts of the nation. The New Deal was especially popular in the Pacific States, and as a result Roosevelt was assured of carrying the state.

Washington state was won by Governor Franklin D. Roosevelt (D–New York), running with Speaker John Nance Garner, with 57.46 percent of the popular vote, against incumbent President Herbert Hoover (R–California), running with Vice President Charles Curtis, with 33.94 percent of the popular vote. Roosevelt flipped every county won by his rival Hoover in 1928, becoming the first Democrat to sweep every county in Washington state – a feat he would repeat in 1936 but which has never been emulated since. He was the first-ever Democratic victor in the southwestern logging counties of Klickitat, Lewis and Pacific, and also in inland Benton County and Chelan County.

Results

Results by county

See also
 United States presidential elections in Washington (state)

References

Washington
1932
1932 Washington (state) elections